Michele Boldrin (20 August 1956) is an Italian-born economist, academic and former politician expert in economic growth, business cycles, technological progress and intellectual property.  He is the Joseph Gibson Hoyt Distinguished Professor in Arts & Sciences at Washington University in St. Louis. Along with his colleague and coauthor David Levine, he was part of the group of 200 economists publicly opposing the American Recovery and Reinvestment Act of 2009. He later publicly defended his position on the issue in various international media, including a public debate with Brad DeLong.

Biography 
Boldrin was born and raised in Padua, Italy, and later moved to Venice.  He did his undergraduate studies at the University of Venice. He then received his M.S. (1985) and Ph.D. (1987) in economics from the University of Rochester in New York, under the supervision of Lionel McKenzie.  Before moving to St. Louis in the Fall of 2006, he has taught  at University of Chicago (1986–87), UCLA (1987–94), Kellogg School of Management (1990–94), Charles III University of Madrid (1994–99), and University of Minnesota (1999–2006). He is a research fellow at the Federal Reserve Bank of St. Louis since 2006.

He is a Fellow of the Econometric Society, a past Associate Editor of Econometrica and (past) Editor and (current) Associate Editor of the Review of Economic Dynamics, among other academic journals. He (co-)wrote four books and was a visiting professor in Barcelona, Rio de Janeiro, Mexico City, Tokyo, and a number of other places. He is affiliated with CEPR and director of FEDEA. He is one of the founding editors of the Italian blog noiseFromAmerika and he contributes regularly to Against Monopoly and Nada es Gratis, which are respectively in English and Spanish. His two most recent books are Against Intellectual Monopoly, coauthored with David K. Levine (CUP, 2008) and Tremonti, istruzioni per il disuso, coauthored with Alberto Bisin, Sandro Brusco, Andrea Moro and Giulio Zanella (Ancora, 2010), in Italian.

Before the 2013 Italian general election, he co-founded with economist Luigi Zingales and journalist Oscar Giannino the political movement Act to Stop the Decline. Because of the poor results the party achieved in the 2014 European Parliament election, he resigned. Later on, he focused on his own YouTube channel and founded in late 2018 a libertarian think-tank called Liberi Oltre le illusioni (Free Beyond Illusions). Boldrin is a member of the Board of Trustees and the Scientific Council of Foundation IMDEA Social Sciences.

Political and scientific views
He has been an outspoken critic of Modern Monetary Theory, debating with American economist Warren Mosler, as well as Italian journalist Paolo Barnard. In his youth, he has been an Avanguardia Operaia supporter, while taking office as provincial secretary of the Italian Communist Youth Federation. Later on he, was a GOP and Lega Nord supporter, advocating for more cultural liberal positions, and later endorsed Italian anti-religious activist Marco Cappato. He is critical of More Europe, the party Cappato belongs to, especially criticizing their economic plan, as well as the alliances within the party, and defined the members of the party as "sell-outs". He compared the Donald Trump-led GOP to the Italian right-wing party Lega Nord (after the rise of Matteo Salvini), as well as to Berlusconism. He criticized Nassim Taleb, as well as econophysics in general, debating with Italian geologist Francesco Sylos Labini, son of the Schumpeterian economist Paolo Sylos Labini.

Research 
Michele Boldrin conducts ongoing research in dynamic general equilibrium theory, focusing specifically on the sources of business fluctuations, growth and development, technological innovation, and intellectual property. Collaborating with David K. Levine, Boldrin examines the role played by competitive versus monopolistic markets in growth and innovation. They posit that little evidence exists for the presence of increasing returns at the aggregate level, and thus argue that there is no reason to believe that increasing returns play an important role in actual economic growth. This implies that, in theory as in practice, competitive markets favor and promote continued growth and innovation, whereas monopoly power is not necessary and probably harmful to technological change and economic development. Their theory concludes that existing claims for the necessity of intellectual property in the process of growth and innovation are greatly exaggerated.

Books 
 Michele Boldrin and David K. Levine, Against Intellectual Monopoly, Cambridge University Press, 2008.

References

External links 
 
 Michele Boldrin's biography
 Publications, from the Open Library.
 Blog on il Fatto Quotidiano
 NoiseFromAmerika
 

1956 births
Living people
Washington University in St. Louis faculty
University of Rochester alumni
Intellectual property activism
Politicians from Padua
People from St. Louis
University of Minnesota faculty
Northwestern University faculty
Academic staff of the Charles III University of Madrid
Fellows of the Econometric Society
Italian emigrants to the United States
Economists from Missouri
21st-century American economists
Act to Stop the Decline politicians